Ashaghi Mahalla Synagogue, in translation from Azerbaijani  - "Synagogue of the Lower Quarter", is a synagogue of the 19th century located in the city of Oghuz in the Republic of Azerbaijan.

History 
The Synagogue of the Lower Quarter, located on Gudrat Aghakishiev Street in the city of Oghuz, was built in 1849. After Soviet occupation, the synagogues edifice was used as a warehouse. After Azerbaijan regained its independence, the synagogue was restored by the local Jews (1992-1994). Although more than a century and a half have passed, the pillars used in the construction of the synagogue remain intact.

Photos

See also 
 History of the Jews in Azerbaijan
 Yukhari Mahalla Synagogue

References

Synagogues in Oghuz